Scarborough Centre is a provincial electoral district in Ontario, Canada, that has been represented in Legislative Assembly of Ontario since 1963.

It consists of the part of the Scarborough district of the City of Toronto bounded:
on the west by Victoria Park Avenue,
on the north by Highway 401,
on the east by McCowan Road, Lawrence Avenue East and Bellamy Road North, and
on the south by Eglinton Avenue East.

Notable landmarks in Scarborough Centre include:
 Scarborough Civic Centre, site of east Toronto district council meetings, and adjacent Albert Campbell Square
 Scarborough Town Centre, a large shopping mall
 Scarborough Centre (TTC) Line 3 station
 Scarborough and Rouge Hospital, General Division
 Scarborough Museum

It was represented in the Ontario Legislature by PC Christina Mitas since 2018, who did not run for re-election in 2022.

Scarborough Centre is a bellwether riding, having voted for the winner in every election since 1971 (longer than any other provincial riding). However, it did comprise different territories, changing shape significantly between the 1995 and 1999 elections.

Boundaries
The riding was created in 1963 through an amendment to the Representation Act. It was formed from the south central part of the former riding of York—Scarborough, formed in 1955, the year following the erection of Metropolitan Toronto, departing from York East, where it had been part of since 1867, and represented in the past by such Scarborough Township residents as:
  John Richardson, (1894-1904),  
  Alexander McCowan, (1905-1913),
  John A. Leslie, (1945-1948), and
  Hollis Beckett; (1951-1967) the latter remained with the York East riding.

With the rapid growth of Scarborough Township in the decade following the erection of Metropolitan Toronto, York—Scarborough, unlike its federal counterpart that remained into the 1970s, was split into four separate ridings in 1963; and MPP Dick Sutton did not seek re-election into any of the new ridings.
The initial Scarborough Centre riding was bordered by:
Lawrence Avenue to the north, Kennedy Road to the west, Lake Ontario to the south and Markham Road to the east.

In 1975, the boundary was significantly altered. The northern boundary of Lawrence Avenue and the southern boundary of Lake Ontario were retained. The western boundary was redrawn as follows: from Lawrence Avenue, it followed the CNR right-of-way located west of Midland Avenue south and then curved southeast to where it met Midland Avenue at Danforth Road. It followed Midland Avenue south to Kingston Road where it turned southwest following Kingston to a point where a northerly extension of Wynnview Court would meet the road. It then turned south along Wynnview Court and continued on the same line south until it met the lake. The eastern boundary started at Lawrence Avenue and went south on Scarborough Golf Club Road following this road to the CNR right-of-way. It followed the tracks west to Markham Road and then south to the lake.

In 1987 the boundary was altered again. The northern boundary of Lawrence Avenue and the southern boundary of Lake Ontario were retained. The eastern boundary starting at the lake went north along Kennedy Road to Eglinton Avenue. It then turned east for a short distance to the CPR right-of-way. It followed the right-of-way north to Lawrence Avenue. The eastern border was moved to Markham Road going from the lake to Lawrence Avenue.

In 1995, the riding was radically changed with a union with the Scarborough-Ellesmere riding, and in 2007, with the creation of the Scarborough-Guildwood riding, and the northwest corner transferred from Scarborough-Agincourt. For the first time, the Scarborough Centre was now in the riding.

Members of Provincial Parliament

Election results

2007 electoral reform referendum

Historic election results

References

External links
Elections Ontario Past Election Results
Map of riding for 2018 election

Ontario provincial electoral districts
Provincial electoral districts of Toronto
Scarborough, Toronto